Bugry is a rural locality (a settlement) in Novonikolayevsky Selsoviet, Rubtsovsky District, Altai Krai, Russia. The population was 172 as of 2013. There are 2 streets.

Geography 
Bugry is located 42 km southeast of Rubtsovsk (the district's administrative centre) by road. Pokrovka is the nearest rural locality.

References 

Rural localities in Rubtsovsky District